Matti Olavi Harju (born 14 July 1943) is a Finnish former ice hockey center and Olympian.

Harju played with Team Finland at the 1968 Winter Olympics held in Grenoble, France. He previously played for RU-38 Pori, HIFK Helsinki, Upon Pallo Lahti, and Ilves Tampere in SM-Liiga.

References

1943 births
Living people
Ice hockey players at the 1968 Winter Olympics
Olympic ice hockey players of Finland
Ice hockey people from Tampere
Ilves players
HIFK (ice hockey) players
Finnish ice hockey centres